The Malše is a river in Upper Austria and in the Czech Republic, a right tributary of the Vltava.

It flows northward and forms  of Austria-Czech border before fully entering the Český Krumlov District of South Bohemian Region near Dolní Dvořiště. Other communities along the Malše include Rychnov nad Malší, Kaplice, Římov, and Doudleby.

In the city of České Budějovice, the Malše joins the Vltava.

References 
 Information at the Water Management Research Institute

Rivers of the South Bohemian Region
Rivers of Upper Austria
International rivers of Europe
Austria–Czech Republic border
Rivers of Austria
Border rivers